Frankford is a locality and small rural community in the local government areas of Latrobe (in the north), West Tamar (in the east), and Meander Valley (in the west), in the North West region of Tasmania.
The 2016 census determined a population of 176 for the state suburb of Frankford.

History
The name first appeared on a map in 1883. The locality was gazetted in 1966.

Geography
The locality consists of a valley with higher ground on either side, but does not contain a major stream. Most of it is drained by the Franklin Rivulet, which runs to the north-west and discharges into the Rubicon Estuary. The southern tip has creeks that run south to the Meander River, while part of the south-east drains east to the Supply River, which discharges into the Tamar River.

Road infrastructure
The B71 route (Frankford Road) runs through the locality from south-east to north-west. Route C715 (Holwell Road) starts at an intersection with B71 and runs north before exiting. Route B72 (Birralee Road) starts at an intersection with B71 on the south-east boundary and runs away to the south.

References

Localities of Latrobe Council
Localities of West Tamar Council
Localities of Meander Valley Council
Towns in Tasmania